Ramdas Ambatkar is an Indian politician belonging to the Bharatiya Janata Party. On 24 May 2018, he was elected to the Maharashtra Legislative Council by receiving 550 votes, beating his rival Indrakumar Saraf from Indian National Congress, who received 462 votes.

References

Bharatiya Janata Party politicians from Maharashtra
Living people
Members of the Maharashtra Legislative Council
Year of birth missing (living people)